The Tecolotes de los Dos Laredos (Two Laredos Owls), formerly known as the Tecolotes de Nuevo Laredo (Nuevo Laredo Owls), are a Minor League Baseball team based in Nuevo Laredo, Tamaulipas, and Laredo, Texas in the Mexican League. 

The Tecolotes are a binational baseball team, splitting their home games between Mexico and the United States. Their home games in Mexico are played at Parque la Junta, while their home games in the United States are played at Uni-Trade Stadium.

History

The Tecolotes de los dos Laredos were originally named the Tecolotes de Nuevo Laredo from their founding in 1940 to 1985, during which time they only played in Nuevo Laredo. In 1985, the Tecolotes played games on both of the sides of the border in Nuevo Laredo and Laredo. In 2004, the Tecolotes were transferred to Tijuana and were renamed Potros de Tijuana. The Tecolotes were the Mexican League Champions in 1953, 1954, 1958, 1977, and 1989; and were runners-up in 1945, 1955, 1959, 1985, 1987, 1992, and 1993.

Baseball returned to the city in 2008 when the Rieleros de Aguascalientes were transferred to Nuevo Laredo as the Tecolotes de Nuevo Laredo. The Tecolotes did not play in the 2011–2012 seasons, but had hopes of returning for the 2013 season. The owner was trying to sell the team to León, Guanajuato. On November 22, 2011, the team was sold to a Colombian investor and the team was transferred to Ciudad del Carmen, Campeche.

After the 2017 season, the Rojos del Águila de Veracruz franchise was relocated to Nuevo Laredo, and the team was rebranded to the Tecolotes de los Dos Laredos in 2018. They play half of their home games at Estadio Nuevo Laredo and the other half at Uni-Trade Stadium.</onlyinclude>

Championships

Roster

References

External links
Tecolotes de los Dos Laredos Official Website(Spanish)
Tecolotes de Nuevo Laredo Official Website (Spanish)
Liga Mexicana de Beisbol Official Website (Spanish)

Nuevo Laredo
Sports in Laredo, Texas
Baseball teams in Mexico
Professional baseball teams in Texas
Baseball teams established in 1940
Sports clubs disestablished in 2011
Baseball teams established in 2018
Mexican League teams
Sports teams in Tamaulipas